Baljkovac is a village in Pivara municipality of Kragujevac in the Šumadija District of central Serbia.

References

External links
Satellite map at Maplandia.com

Populated places in Šumadija District
Kragujevac